Luke Ian Georgeson (born 14 April 1999) is a New Zealand cricketer. Georgeson holds an Irish passport, and became eligible to represent the Ireland cricket team in early 2022.

Career
Georgeson made his List A debut on 5 February 2020, for Wellington in the 2019–20 Ford Trophy in New Zealand. Prior to his List A debut, he was named in New Zealand's squad for the 2018 Under-19 Cricket World Cup. He made his first-class debut on 11 March 2021, for Wellington in the 2020–21 Plunket Shield season.

In April 2021, Georgeson was named in the Northern Knights' squad ahead of the domestic season in Ireland. He made his Twenty20 debut on 18 June 2021, for Northern Knights in the 2021 Inter-Provincial Trophy. He also finished as the third-highest run-scorer in the 2021 Inter-Provincial Cup, with 317 runs.

In April 2022, Georgeson switched his allegiance from New Zealand to Ireland, and was offered a central contract by Cricket Ireland. However, late the same month, Georgeson withdrew from his contract with Cricket Ireland to look at playing for New Zealand.

References

External links
 

1999 births
Living people
New Zealand cricketers
Irish cricketers
Wellington cricketers
Northern Knights cricketers
Cricketers from Wellington City